Aurdal is a village in Nord-Aurdal Municipality in Innlandet county, Norway. The river Begna flows past Aurdal, just south of the village. Aurdal Church is located in the village.

References

Nord-Aurdal
Villages in Innlandet